Milldale, Virginia is a community in Warren County, Virginia. Mount Zion was listed on the National Register of Historic Places in 1970.

References

Geography of Warren County, Virginia